Immortelle is another name for everlastings, plants in the family Asteraceae. It may also refer to:

Plants
 Erythrina fusca, found in tropical and subtropical regions
 Helichrysum arenarium, found in Eurasia
 Helichrysum italicum, found in southern Europe
 Xeranthemum annuum, found in Eurasia

Other uses
Immortelle, an album by Dew-Scented
Immortelle, an album by Say Lou Lou
"Immortelle" (song), by Lara Fabian (2001)
 Immortelle (cemetery), artificial and hence long-lasting flowers placed on graves
L'Immortelle, a 1963 French-Turkish film

See also
 Immortel (disambiguation)